Death Has a Bad Reputation is a 1990 British made-for-television action thriller film based on a story by Frederick Forsyth starring Tony Lo Bianco, Pamela Villoresi and Elizabeth Hurley. It was originally broadcast 24 November 1990 in the UK on ITV as part of Frederick Forsyth Presents series of six thriller films based on stories by Forsyth.

Synopsis
A British agent chases after notorious international terrorist Ilich Ramírez Sánchez, known as "Carlos the Jackal", when he resurfaces in Europe. Intelligence networks worldwide are involved when Donatini, a United States Department of State employee, is assassinated.

Cast
Tony Lo Bianco as Carlos
Pamela Villoresi as Antonella
Elizabeth Hurley as Julia Latham
Gottfried John as Rodimstev
Alan Howard as Sam McCready
Venantino Venantini as Umberto Aidoni
David Lyon as Patrick Cowlishaw
Richard Hope as Spry
Garrick Hagon as Stephen T. Hamilton
Philip Lowrie as Superintendent Jamieson
Nancy Lippold  as Patricia

References

External links 

1990 films
1990 television films
1990 action thriller films
British thriller television films
British action thriller films
British spy films
Films based on works by Frederick Forsyth
Films based on mystery novels
Cultural depictions of Carlos the Jackal
ITV (TV network) original programming
Films scored by Paul Chihara
1990s English-language films
1990s British films